Fåset is a village in Tynset Municipality in Innlandet county, Norway. The village is located at the southern end of the Fådalen valley, where the river Fåa meets the larger river Glåma. The Norwegian National Road 3 runs through the village.

References

Tynset
Villages in Innlandet